Alberto Downey (2 October 1890, date of death unknown) was a Chilean cyclist. He competed in two events at the 1912 Summer Olympics.

References

External links
 

1890 births
Year of death missing
Chilean male cyclists
Olympic cyclists of Chile
Cyclists at the 1912 Summer Olympics
People from Linares, Jaén
Sportspeople from the Province of Jaén (Spain)